Megalodon: The Monster Shark Lives is a 2013 film that aired on the Discovery Channel about the potential survival of the prehistoric shark. Purported to be a documentary, the story revolves around numerous videos, photographs, and firsthand encounters with a megalodon and an ensuing investigation that points to the involvement of the prehistoric species, despite the long-held belief of its extinction. The film is presented as factual, including accounts from professionals in various fields such as marine biology. Soon after the film premiered however, the "documentary" was swiftly debunked as a fictional production with actors posing as scientists, accompanied by "evidence" which was completely manufactured. It wasn't until the subsequent public outrage that the network added brief disclaimers at the beginning and end, indicating the program is fictional.

The show, similar to the Animal Planet's pseudo-documentary Mermaids: The Body Found, came under heavy criticism by both scientists and viewers due to the blatant attempt to present something fictional as a documentary. Despite the disclaimers, viewers were offended that docufiction aired on Discovery Channel—the preeminent US network for producing educational and credible scientific programs.

Megalodon: The Monster Shark Lives ranks as the most-watched Shark Week show to date, with 4.8 million viewers. Much of the attention garnered by the film was the result of the backlash, though host Brian Switek said that the film "gave science communicators like me an easy target". The special received a sequel titled Megalodon: The New Evidence. During Shark Week 2018, Discovery aired Megalodon: Fact vs. Fiction, a new special with experts that reflects on the original.

See also
 Shark Week
 Ocean of Fear
 Blood in the Water
 Capsized: Blood in the Water
 The Last Dragon, a similar program airing on Animal Planet that attempted to describe dragons in a scientific manner.

References

External links
 

American docufiction films
2013 television films
2013 films
2013 hoaxes
Films about shark attacks
Films about sharks
2010s science fiction films
2010s American films